Rishtey is a television series that aired from 1998 to 2001 on Zee TV channel.

Plot

It features small stories of human relationships. The show highlights the essence of life and brings to the forefront the various aspects of human relationships, such as husbands and wives, lovers, parents and children, friends and siblings. Each episode delves into the intricate lives of the characters, their circumstances and their deepest emotions.

List of Episodes

References

Meteor Films produced 3 story's of Rishtey
All episodes of Rishtey in an easily view-able & searchable format
I Love You Papa on IMDB

Zee TV original programming
Indian anthology television series
1999 Indian television series debuts
2001 Indian television series endings
Indian LGBT-related television shows
Bollywood in fiction